Jörgen Olsson (born 11 October 1971) is a Swedish orienteering competitor. He received a bronze medal in the relay event at the 1999 World Orienteering Championships, and received a bronze medal in the sprint event at the 2001 World Orienteering Championships in Tampere.

References

External links
 
 

1971 births
Living people
Swedish orienteers
Male orienteers
Foot orienteers
World Orienteering Championships medalists